Patricia Brown may refer to:
Patricia Brown (baseball) (1931–2013), American baseball player
Patricia Brown (engineer) (born 1928), American chemical engineer
Trish Brown (born 1963), American education advocate, public relations practitioner, journalist, and entrepreneur
Patricia Fortini Brown (born 1936), American art historian
Patricia Brown (actress) from Danielle Steel's A Perfect Stranger

See also
Pat Brown (disambiguation)